Leonardo Della Torre (Genoa, 1570Genoa, 16 August 1651) was the 100th Doge of the Republic of Genoa.

Biography 
On June 30, 1631, his person, who was still the supreme union and senator, was chosen by the Grand Council to lead the highest office in the state, the fifty-fifth in biennial succession and the hundredth in republican history. His dogate was remembered in the Genoese chronicles mainly for the peace negotiation that he started with the Duchy of Savoy. He ended his two-year term on 30 June 1633, but until his death in 1651 he continued to serve the state in official positions.

See also 
 Republic of Genoa
 Doge of Genoa

References 

17th-century Doges of Genoa
1570 births
1651 deaths